Gianna Hablützel-Bürki (née Bürki, born 22 December 1969 in Basel) is a female épée fencer.

Life
She married Christoph Hablützel in 1997. They have a daughter named Demi, born in 1998 and currently live in Riehen/Basel-City

Occupation
 Épée fencer
 Founder & Co-president of the 'Fechtverein Basel' – & Riehen-Scorpions
 Youth fencing trainer
 President of the Swiss Olympic Athletes Commission (SOAC)

Career

Individual
 9-times Swiss Champion
 4-times World Cup winner
 2-times bronze medal winner at the European Championships (1994 + 1995)
 2-times silver medal winner at the European Championships (1993 + 1996)
 Ranked 11th at the Olympic Games 1996 in Atlanta
 Silver medal winner at the Olympic Games 2000 in Sydney
 Bronze medal winner at the World Championships 2001 in Nîmes

Team
 6-times Swiss Champion
 Bronze medal winner at the World Championships 1989 in Denver
 Ranked 4th at the World Championships 1999 in Seoul
 European Champion 2000 in Madeira
 Silver medal winner at the Olympic Games 2000 in Sydney
 Silver medal winner at the World Championships 2001 in Nîmes
 1995 French Champion with Racing Club de France, Paris

See also
Fencing at the 2000 Summer Olympics

References

External links
  Official Homepage of Gianna Hablützel-Bürki (German)
 Schweizer Fechtverband

1969 births
Living people
Swiss female épée fencers
Fencers at the 1996 Summer Olympics
Fencers at the 2000 Summer Olympics
Olympic fencers of Switzerland
Olympic silver medalists for Switzerland
Olympic medalists in fencing
Medalists at the 2000 Summer Olympics
Sportspeople from Basel-Stadt
People from Riehen